Ayman Saied Joumaa is a Colombian/Lebanese national and alleged drug kingpin. The US Treasury Department alleges that his organization launders money and traffics illicit drugs in the Americas, Middle East, Europe, and Africa, and that he has ties to Hezbollah and the Los Zetas cartel.

On January 26, 2011, the US Treasury Department's Office of Foreign Assets Control (OFAC) listed him as a Specially Designated Narcotics Trafficker under the Foreign Narcotics Kingpin Designation Act. On November 23, 2011, a federal grand jury indicted Joumaa for distributing tens of thousands of kilograms of cocaine from Colombia through Central America to Los Zetas in Mexico and for laundering millions of dollars' worth of drug money from Mexico, Europe, and West Africa to Colombia and Venezuela.

References

Living people
Colombian drug traffickers
Money launderers
Lebanese criminals
Year of birth missing (living people)